Jack Aitken (Korean: 한세용, Han Se-yong; born 23 September 1995 in London) is a British-South Korean racing driver who currently competes for Racing Team Turkey in the European Le Mans Series and for Emil Frey Racing in the ADAC GT Masters and the GT World Challenge Europe Endurance Cup. He was a former reserve driver for Williams Racing in Formula One, having previously been part of the Renault Sport Academy and Williams Driver Academy.

Born in London to a Scottish father and South Korean mother, Aitken began his career in karting at Buckmore Park, aged 7. He made the transition to cars when he competed in the Intersteps Championship with Fortec Motorsport, with whom he then went on to race with in the Formula Renault BARC Winter Series, Formula Renault NEC and Formula Renault Eurocup.

After winning the Formula Renault Eurocup in 2015, Aitken was signed up for the Renault young driver academy, with which he remained until 2019. After competing in the GP3 Series in 2016 and 2017 he progressed to Formula 2 for 2018. He has been Williams F1's reserve driver since 2020, and raced for the team at the 2020 Sakhir Grand Prix, replacing George Russell, who, in turn, replaced Lewis Hamilton at Mercedes for the event.

Career

Karting 
Aitken started his karting career at Buckmore Park Kart Circuit in Kent. He competed in the 2010 Super 1 National Kart Championships in the Rotax Mini Max class, finishing third behind champion and future Formula 2 teammate George Russell.

Formula Renault 

Aitken progressed into single-seater car racing in 2012, competing in the four races of the 2012 Formula Renault BARC Winter Series. He won the final race at Rockingham Motor Speedway and finished second in the standings behind Fortec Motorsport teammate Seb Morris. He also competed for Fortec in the 2012 Dunlop InterSteps Championship, taking two wins to finish third in the championship behind future GP3 Series competitor Matt Parry.

In 2013 Aitken competed in the Formula Renault 2.0 Northern European Cup, in a field which included future Formula One drivers Esteban Ocon and Alex Albon. He finished second in the championship, again losing out to Fortec teammate Parry. Aitken also appeared as a guest driver in three rounds of the main Eurocup Formula Renault 2.0 series, recording a best finish of ninth place at the Red Bull Ring.

Aitken entered his first full season of Eurocup Formula Renault 2.0 in 2014 with Fortec. He won one race at the Hungaroring and finished on the podium three further times to end the season seventh in the championship. During the first half of the campaign, he had to finish his A-Level qualifications while attending Westminster School. He also made guest appearances in the Formula Renault 2.0 Alps series, with best finishes of fourth place at the Imola Circuit.

For 2015, Aitken moved to Koiranen GP in Formula Renault 2.0, contesting both the Eurocup and Alps series. He won both titles at the final rounds at the Circuito de Jerez, one week apart. He took nine race wins in total, finishing ahead of Louis Delétraz in the Eurocup and Jake Hughes in the Alps series.

Pro Mazda Championship
Aitken made his first appearance in American open-wheel racing in 2014, competing in one round of the Pro Mazda Championship (now the Indy Pro 2000 Championship) at the Sonoma Raceway with a best finish of fourth place. In 2015 he took part in the Pro Mazda Winterfest for Team Pelfrey. He won three of the five races to win the championship ahead of future IndyCar driver Dalton Kellett and future Williams Formula One teammate Nicholas Latifi.

GP3 Series

2016 
In January 2016, Aitken stepped up to the GP3 Series with Arden International. In his maiden season, he claimed a victory at Spa-Francorchamps and six additional podiums to finish fifth in the overall standings, one point behind teammate Jake Dennis. In that year, Aitken also made brief appearances in the Euroformula Open and Formula V8 3.5 series, claiming two wins and two pole positions in four races in Euroformula Open and a pole position in Formula V8 3.5.

2017 
In February 2017, it was announced that Aitken would remain in the GP3 Series, switching to reigning team champions ART Grand Prix. He took one race win at the Hungaroring and five further podium finishes, finishing second in the championship with 141 points, behind champion and former karting rival George Russell on 220 points.

Formula 2

2018 

In January 2018, ART Grand Prix announced Aitken would join their Formula 2 team for the 2018 FIA Formula 2 Championship, again partnering Russell. He took his first podium finish with second place in the Baku feature race, and later took his first victory in the Barcelona sprint race. He finished 11th in the championship with 63 points, whilst Russell claimed the title with 287 points.

2019 

For the 2019 season Aitken moved to Campos Racing, initially partnering Dorian Boccolacci and later Arjun Maini and Marino Sato. Aitken took his first win of the season, and Campos Racing's first win in Formula 2, at the Baku feature race. He also won his home sprint race at Silverstone, after overtaking Louis Delétraz on lap 17. Aitken also won the Monza sprint race after defending from the MP Motorsport car of Jordan King. King criticised Aitken's defensive driving as he claimed after the race that Aitken was weaving down the straight. Aitken finished fifth in the standings, scoring 159 of Campos' 189 points and helping them to finish fifth in the teams' championship.

2020 
Aitken remained at Campos for 2020, partnering Guilherme Samaia. Aitken took a double-podium finish at the second Silverstone round, finishing third in both the feature race and sprint race. He was involved in a high-speed collision with Luca Ghiotto on lap seven of the sprint race at Sochi Autodrom. Both drivers were uninjured, but damage to the barriers caused the race to be red-flagged and not restarted. Aitken missed the final round at the Bahrain International Circuit to race in Formula One, and was replaced by Ralph Boschung. Aitken finished 14th in the standings, scoring all of Campos' 48 points.

2021 
Aitken left Campos and the Formula 2 series after 2020, however he returned during the  season with HWA Racelab as a replacement for Matteo Nannini, who withdrew from the championship after the first round. He was initially signed for the second and third rounds in Monaco and Baku respectively and was later retained for the fourth round at Silverstone. He recorded a best finish of ninth place in the second Monaco sprint race, but failed to score points over the three rounds.

GT World Challenge Europe 
After leaving Campos in Formula 2, Aitken switched to sports car racing and joined the GT World Challenge Europe. He competes in both the Endurance and Sprint cups, driving a Lamborghini Huracán GT3 Evo for Emil Frey Racing alongside Konsta Lappalainen. His first race was the 3 Hours of Monza, for which Aitken and his teammates qualified 14th. However, Aitken did not drive in the race as the car was retired following damage from a puncture.

In July 2021 during the Spa 24 Hours event, Aitken was involved in a crash along with 3 other drivers. He crashed into the barrier after Raidillon, bounced back onto the track and came to a stop before being hit from behind by another driver which caused two further cars to become entangled in the accident. Aitken was taken to hospital where he stayed overnight. His injuries were described as non life-threatening though serious and it was later revealed that he had sustained "a broken collarbone, a fractured vertebra ... and a very small lung contusion".

For the 2022 season, Aitken is racing exclusively in the endurance rounds of the championship, paring up with Mirko Bortolotti and Albert Costa in the same Emil Frey Racing Lamborghini. He finished 13th and 6th in the first two races, held in Imola and Paul Ricard respectively. In the 24 Hours of Spa, after a crash for Costa, Aitken failed to finish the race.

Formula One

Renault (2016–2019) 
In February 2016, Aitken was one of four drivers confirmed to join the young driver program of Renault F1. In September 2017, Aitken sampled Formula One machinery for the first time, testing the Lotus E20 at Jerez. In February 2018, Aitken was appointed as third and reserve driver for Renault. That year, he tested the Renault R.S.18 at the Circuit de Barcelona-Catalunya during the young drivers' test. Another test came at Suzuka where once again he drove the R.S.18. Aitken continued as test driver for Renault in 2019, and once again took part in the 2019 young drivers' test at Barcelona. In February 2020, Aitken left Renault.

Williams (2020–2022) 
For the 2020 season Aitken joined the Williams Driver Academy alongside Formula 2 rivals Dan Ticktum and Roy Nissany, and W Series and Extreme E driver Jamie Chadwick. Aitken was also appointed Williams' reserve driver. He drove in the first practice session (FP1) of the 2020 Styrian Grand Prix for the team.

Aitken made his Formula One debut as a race driver with Williams at the 2020 Sakhir Grand Prix as a replacement for George Russell, who was promoted to Mercedes following Lewis Hamilton's positive coronavirus test. Aitken stated before the event he had been "ready since Melbourne [March]" for such an opportunity. He chose to race with the car number 89, in reference to a number he previously used in karting. He qualified for the race in 18th place, within a tenth of a second of teammate and regular driver Nicholas Latifi. On lap 61 of 87, 15th-placed Aitken spun at the final corner, colliding with a barrier and breaking off his front wing. He returned to the pits for a replacement and was able to continue the race, eventually finishing 16th. He later remarked that he had mixed feelings about the race, stating "I think we were doing a really good job up until my little incident. I can only apologise to the whole team", but that there were "a lot of positives to take from the weekend".

Aitken performed Thursday media duties with Williams ahead of the next race in Abu Dhabi but ultimately did not drive the car, as Russell returned to the team prior to FP1 when Hamilton was passed fit to return to Mercedes.

In March 2021, Williams announced that Aitken would continue to be their reserve driver for the  season.

Aitken retained his reserve driver role with Williams for the  season. He did not partake in any practice sessions that year, and at the start of 2023, he was announced that he would split with Williams, in order to focus on his sportscar career.

Sportscar racing

ADAC GT Masters 
In 2022 Aitken moved to the ADAC GT Masters, racing with Albert Costa for Emil Frey Racing.

European Le Mans 
As of 2022, Aitken competes in the LMP2 Pro-Am class for Racing Team Turkey alongside Charlie Eastwood and Salih Yoluç. After round two, they lead the Pro-Am championship standings.

24 Hours of Le Mans 

Aitken made his 24 Hours of Le Mans in the 2022 edition, competing for Algarve Pro Racing alongside Sophia Flörsch and John Falb. The trio finished 25th overall, 20th in the LMP2 class and 5th in the Pro-Am sub class.

2023: GTP and DTM 
For the 2023 season, Aitken would perform double-duties in America and Europe, racing the new Cadillac V-LMDh in the IMSA SportsCar Championship for Whelen Engineering Racing whilst also contesting the DTM with Emil Frey Racing.

Karting record

Karting career summary

Racing record

Racing career summary 

† As Aitken was a guest driver, he was ineligible for championship points.
* Season still in progress.

American open-wheel racing results

Pro Mazda Championship

Complete GP3 Series results 
(key) (Races in bold indicate pole position) (Races in italics indicate fastest lap)

Complete Formula V8 3.5 Series results 
(key) (Races in bold indicate pole position) (Races in italics indicate fastest lap)

Complete FIA Formula 2 Championship results 
(key) (Races in bold indicate pole position) (Races in italics indicate points for the fastest lap of top ten finishers)

† Driver did not finish the race, but was classified as he completed over 90% of the race distance.
‡ Half points were awarded as less than 75% of the scheduled race distance was completed.

Complete Formula One results

Complete GT World Challenge Europe Endurance Cup results 
(key) (Races in bold indicate pole position) (Races in italics indicate fastest lap)

* Season still in progress.

Complete GT World Challenge Europe Sprint Cup results
(key) (Races in bold indicate pole position) (Races in italics indicate fastest lap)

Complete ADAC GT Masters results 
(key) (Races in bold indicate pole position) (Races in italics indicate fastest lap)

* Season still in progress.

Complete European Le Mans Series results 
(key) (Races in bold indicate pole position; results in italics indicate fastest lap)

* Season still in progress.

Complete 24 Hours of Le Mans results

Complete IMSA SportsCar Championship results
(key) (Races in bold indicate pole position) (Races in italics indicate fastest lap)

References

External links 

1995 births
Living people
Sportspeople from London
Scottish racing drivers
Formula Renault 2.0 NEC drivers
Formula Renault Eurocup drivers
Formula Renault 2.0 Alps drivers
Indy Pro 2000 Championship drivers
GP3 Series drivers
Euroformula Open Championship drivers
World Series Formula V8 3.5 drivers
English people of Korean descent
FIA Formula 2 Championship drivers
People educated at Westminster School, London
Williams Formula One drivers
Manor Motorsport drivers
MP Motorsport drivers
Koiranen GP drivers
Arden International drivers
RP Motorsport drivers
ART Grand Prix drivers
Campos Racing drivers
Emil Frey Racing drivers
HWA Team drivers
Scottish Formula One drivers
24 Hours of Le Mans drivers
ADAC GT Masters drivers
Team Pelfrey drivers
European Le Mans Series drivers
Fortec Motorsport drivers
Formula Renault BARC drivers
Lamborghini Squadra Corse drivers
WeatherTech SportsCar Championship drivers
Action Express Racing drivers
Deutsche Tourenwagen Masters drivers